An extended play (EP) is a musical recording that contains more tracks than a single but fewer than an album or LP record. Contemporary EPs generally contain four or five tracks, and are considered "less expensive and time-consuming" for an artist to produce than an album. An EP originally referred to specific types of records other than 78 rpm standard play (SP) and LP, but it is now applied to mid-length CDs and downloads as well. In K-pop they are usually referred to as mini albums. Ricardo Baca of The Denver Post said, "EPs—originally extended-play 'single' releases that are shorter than traditional albums—have long been popular with punk and indie bands." In the United Kingdom, the Official Chart Company defines a boundary between EP and album classification at 25 minutes of maximum length and no more than four tracks (not counting alternative versions of featured songs, if present).

Background

History
EPs were released in various sizes in different eras. The earliest multi-track records, issued around 1919 by Grey Gull Records, were vertically cut 78rpm discs known as "2-in-1" records. These had finer than usual grooves, like Edison Disc Records. By 1949, when the 45rpm single and 33rpm LP were competing formats, seven-inch 45rpm singles had a maximum playing time of only about four minutes per side.

Partly as an attempt to compete with the LP introduced in 1948 by rival Columbia, RCA Victor introduced "Extended Play" 45s during 1952. Their narrower grooves, achieved by lowering the cutting levels and sound compression optionally, enabled them to hold up to 7.5 minutes per side—but still be played by a standard 45rpm phonograph. In the early era record companies released the entire content of LPs as 45rpm EPs. These were usually 10-inch LPs (released until the mid-1950s) split onto two seven-inch EPs or 12-inch LPs split onto three seven-inch EPs, either sold separately or together in gatefold covers. This practice became much less common with the advent of triple-speed-available phonographs.

Introduced by RCA in the US in 1952, EMI issued the first EPs in Britain in April 1954. EPs were usually compilations of singles or album samplers and were typically played at 45rpm on seven-inch (18 cm) discs, with two songs on each side.
RCA had success in the format with their top money earner, Elvis Presley, issuing 28 Elvis EPs between 1956 and 1967, many of which topped the separate Billboard EP chart during its brief existence.  Other than those published by RCA, EPs were relatively uncommon in the United States and Canada, but they were widely sold in the United Kingdom, and in some other European countries, during the 1950s and 1960s. In Sweden EP was for long the most popular record format, with as much as 85% of the market in the late 1950s being EPs.

Billboard introduced a weekly EP chart in October 1957, noting that "the teen-age market apparently dominates the EP business, with seven out of the top 10 best-selling EP's featuring artists with powerful teen-age appeal — four sets by Elvis Presley, two by Pat Boone and one by Little Richard". Record Retailer printed an EP chart in 1960. The New Musical Express (NME), Melody Maker, Disc and Music Echo and the Record Mirror continued to list EPs on their respective singles charts.  When the BBC and Record Retailer commissioned the British Market Research Bureau (BMRB) (now: Kantar Group) to compile a chart, it was restricted to singles, and EPs disappeared from the listings.

The popularity of EPs in the US had declined in the early 1960s in favour of LPs. In the UK Cliff Richard and The Shadows, both individually and collectively, and The Beatles were the most prolific artists issuing EPs in the 1960s, many of them highly successful releases. The Beatles' Twist and Shout outsold most singles for some weeks in 1963. The success of the EP in Britain lasted until around 1967, but it later had a strong revival with punk rock in the late 1970s and the adaptation of the format for 12" and CD singles.

Notable EP releases
Some classical music albums released at the beginning of the LP era were also distributed as EP albums—notably, the seven operas that Arturo Toscanini conducted on radio between 1944 and 1954. These opera EPs, originally broadcast on the NBC Radio network and manufactured by RCA, which owned the NBC network then, were made available both in 45 rpm and 33 rpm. In the 1990s, they began appearing on compact discs.

During the 1950s, RCA published several EP albums of Walt Disney movies, containing both the story and the songs. These usually featured the original casts of actors and actresses. Each album contained two seven-inch records, plus a fully illustrated booklet containing the text of the recording so that children could follow along by reading. Some of the titles included Snow White and the Seven Dwarfs (1937), Pinocchio (1940), and what was then a recent release, the movie version of 20,000 Leagues Under the Sea that was presented in 1954. The recording and publishing of 20,000 was unusual: it did not employ the movie's cast, and years later, a 12 in rpm album, with a nearly identical script, but another different cast, was sold by Disneyland Records in conjunction with the re-release of the movie in 1963.

Because of the popularity of 7" and other formats, SP (78 rpm, 10") records became less popular and the production of SPs in Japan was suspended in 1963.

In the Philippines, seven-inch EPs marketed as "mini-LPs" (but distinctly different from the mini-LPs of the 1980s) were introduced in 1970, with tracks selected from an album and packaging resembling the album they were taken from. This mini-LP format also became popular in America in the early 1970s for promotional releases, and also for use in jukeboxes.

Stevie Wonder included a bonus four-song EP with his double LP Songs in the Key of Life in 1976. During the 1970s and 1980s, there was less standardization and EPs were made on seven-inch (18 cm), 10-inch (25 cm) or 12-inch (30 cm) discs running either 33 or 45rpm. Some novelty EPs used odd shapes and colors, and a few of them were picture discs.

Alice in Chains was the first band to ever have an EP reach number one on the Billboard album chart. Its EP, Jar of Flies, was released on January 25, 1994. In December of 1997, American rapper Eminem released the Slim Shady EP, which would be the first introduction of his "slim shady" alter ego. In 2004, Linkin Park and Jay-Z's collaboration EP, Collision Course, was the next to reach the number one spot after Alice in Chains. In 2010, the cast of the television series Glee became the first artist to have two EPs reach number one, with Glee: The Music, The Power of Madonna on the week of May 8, 2010, and Glee: The Music, Journey to Regionals on the week of June 26, 2010..

In 2010, Warner Bros. Records revived the format with their "Six-Pak" offering of six songs on a compact disc.

EPs in the digital and streaming era
Due to the increased popularity of music downloads and music streaming beginning the late 2000s, EPs have become a common marketing strategy for pop musicians wishing to remain relevant and deliver music in more consistent timeframes leading to or following full studio albums. In the late 2000s to early 2010s, reissues of studio albums with expanded track listings were common, with the new music often being released as stand-alone EPs. In October 2010, a Vanity Fair article regarding the trend noted post-album EPs as "the next step in extending albums' shelf lives, following the "deluxe" editions that populated stores during the past few holiday seasons—add a few tracks to the back end of an album and release one of them to radio, slap on a new coat of paint, and—voila!—a stocking stuffer is born." Examples of such releases include Lady Gaga's The Fame Monster (2009) following her debut album The Fame (2008), and Kesha's Cannibal (2010) following her debut album Animal (2010).

A 2019 article in Forbes discussing Miley Cyrus' plan to release her then-upcoming seventh studio album as a trilogy of three EPs, beginning with She Is Coming, stated: "By delivering a trio of EPs throughout a period of several months, Miley is giving her fans more of what they want, only in smaller doses. When an artist drops an album, they run the risk of it being forgotten in a few weeks, at which point they need to start work on the follow-up, while still promoting and touring their recent effort. Miley is doing her best to game the system by recording an album and delivering it to fans in pieces." However, this release strategy was later scrapped in favor of the conventional album release of Plastic Hearts. Major-label pop musicians who had previously employed such release strategies include Colbie Caillat with her fifth album Gypsy Heart (2014) being released following an EP of the album's first five tracks known as Gypsy Heart: Side A three months prior to the full album; and Jessie J's fourth studio album R.O.S.E. (2018) which was released as four EPs in as many days entitled R (Realizations), O (Obsessions), S (Sex) and E (Empowerment).

Definition
The first EPs were seven-inch vinyl records with more tracks than a normal single (typically five to nine
of them). Although they shared size and speed with singles, they were a recognisably different format than the seven-inch single. Although they could be named after a lead track, they were generally given a different title. Examples include The Beatles' The Beatles' Hits EP from 1963, and The Troggs' Troggs Tops EP from 1966, both of which collected previously released tracks. The playing time was generally between 10 and 15 minutes. They also came in cardboard picture sleeves at a time when singles were usually issued in paper company sleeves. EPs tended to be album samplers or collections of singles. EPs of all original material began to appear in the 1950s. Examples are Elvis Presley's Love Me Tender from 1956 and "Just for You", "Peace in the Valley" and "Jailhouse Rock" from 1957, and The Kinks' Kinksize Session from 1964.

Twelve-inch EPs were similar, but generally had between three and five tracks and a length of over 12 minutes. Like seven-inch EPs, these were given titles. EP releases were also issued in cassette and 10-inch vinyl formats. With the advent of the compact disc (CD), more music was often included on "single" releases, with four or five tracks being common, and playing times of up to 25 minutes. These extended-length singles became known as maxi singles and while commensurate in length to an EP were distinguished by being designed to feature a single song, with the remaining songs considered B-sides, whereas an EP was designed not to feature a single song, instead resembling a mini album.

EPs of original material regained popularity in the punk rock era, when they were commonly used for the release of new material, e.g. Buzzcocks' Spiral Scratch EP. These featured four-track seven-inch singles played at 33rpm, the most common understanding of the term EP.

Beginning in the 1980s, many so-called "singles" have been sold in formats with more than two tracks. Because of this, the definition of an EP is not determined only by the number of tracks or the playing time; an EP is typically seen as four (or more) tracks of equal importance, as opposed to a four-track single with an obvious A-side and three B-sides.

In the United States, the Recording Industry Association of America, the organization that declares releases "gold" or "platinum" based on numbers of sales, defines an EP as containing three to five songs or under 30 minutes. On the other hand, The Recording Academy's rules for Grammy Awards state that any release with five or more different songs and a running time of over 15 minutes is considered an album, with no mention of EPs.

In the United Kingdom, any record with more than four distinct tracks or with a playing time of more than 25 minutes is classified as an album for sales-chart purposes. If priced as a single, they will not qualify for the main album chart but can appear in the separate Budget Albums chart.

An intermediate format between EPs and full-length LPs is the mini-LP, which was a common album format in the 1980s. These generally contained 20–30 minutes of music and about seven tracks.

In underground dance music, vinyl EPs have been a longstanding medium for releasing new material, e.g. Fourteenth Century Sky by The Dust Brothers.

Double EPs

A double extended play is a name typically given to vinyl records or compact discs released as a set of two discs, each of which would normally qualify as an EP. The name is thus analogous to double album. As vinyl records, the most common format for the double EP, they consist of a pair of 7-inch discs recorded at 45 or 33 rpm, or two 12-inch discs recorded at 45rpm. The format is useful when an album's worth of material is being pressed by a small plant geared for the production of singles rather than albums and may have novelty value which can be turned to advantage for publicity purposes. Double EPs are rare, since the amount of material recordable on a double EP could usually be more economically and sensibly recorded on a single vinyl LP.

In the 1950s, Capitol Records had released a number of double EPs by its more popular artists, including Les Paul. The pair of double EPs (EBF 1–577, sides 1 to 8!) were described on the original covers as "parts ... of a four-part album". In 1960, Joe Meek released four tracks from his planned I Hear a New World LP on an EP that was marked "Part 1". A second EP was planned, but never appeared; only the sleeve was printed. The first double EP released in Britain was the Beatles' Magical Mystery Tour film soundtrack. Released in December 1967 on EMI's Parlophone label, it contained six songs spread over two 7-inch discs and was packaged with a lavish colour booklet. In the United States and some other countries, the songs were augmented by the band's single A- and B-sides from 1967 to create a full LP –a practice that was common in the US but considered exploitative in the UK. The Style Council album The Cost of Loving was originally issued as two 12-inch EPs.

It is more common for artists to release two 12-inch 45s rather than a single 12-inch LP. Though there are 11 songs that total about 40 minutes, enough for one LP, the songs are spread across two 12" 45rpm discs. Also, the vinyl pressing of Hail to the Thief by Radiohead uses this practice but is considered to be a full-length album. In 1982 Cabaret Voltaire released their studio album "2x45" on the UK-based label Rough Trade, featuring extended tracks over four sides of two 12-inch 45rpm discs, with graphics by artist Neville Brody.  The band subsequently released a further album in this format, 1985's "Drinking Gasoline", on the Virgin Records label.

There are a limited number of double EPs which serve other purposes, however. An example of this is the Dunedin Double EP, which contains tracks by four different bands. Using a double EP in this instance allowed each band to have its tracks occupying a different side. In addition, the groove on the physical record could be wider and thus allow for a louder album.

Jukebox EP

In the 1960s and 1970s, record companies released EP versions of long-play (LP) albums for use in jukeboxes. These were commonly known as "compact 33s" or "little LPs". It was played at 33rpm, was pressed on seven-inch vinyl and frequently had as many as six songs. What made them EP-like was that some songs were omitted for time purposes, and the tracks deemed the most popular were left on. Unlike most EPs before them, and most seven-inch vinyl in general (pre-1970s), these were issued in stereo.

Biggest selling debut EP of all time 
The hard rock band Ugly Kid Joe holds the record of highest selling debut EP with As Ugly as They Wanna Be, which sold two million copies in 1991. In the United Kingdom As Ugly as They Wanna Be was classed as a mini-album, and therefore became their first Top 75 album chart hit, peaking at number 9 in 1992. Where the UK singles charts is concerned (the chart where most EPs charted between the scrapping of the EPs charts and the advent of single track downloads), the first EP to reach number one was Excerpts from "The Roussos Phenomenon" by Greek singer Demis Roussos, a 4-tracker known for its lead track "Forever and Ever".

See also
 List of number-one EPs (UK)

References

Album types
Audio storage
 
Recorded music